Up & Running (UK) Limited is a British retailing group. Established in Harrogate, North Yorkshire, in 1992 by Gillian and Dennis Macfarlane, the company operates 29 stores across the United Kingdom.

Awards
Since the first opening of Up and Running, the company has been recognised with a number of industry awards, showcasing their presence within the running community. In 2006, the company was on The Sunday Times' 2006 Fast Track of Britain's private companies with the fastest growing sales. At the 2018 Running Awards, Up and Running achieved a Gold Award for Best National Retailer and a Bronze Award for Online Retailer. In 2019, the company received Gold Awards for National Retailer and Customer Service Multi Brand and a Bronze Award for Online Retailer Multi Brand.

References

Companies based in Harrogate
Clothing companies established in 1992
Retail companies established in 1992
Shoe companies of the United Kingdom